Mau-Chung Frank Chang (born February 20, 1951) is Distinguished Professor and the Chairman of Electrical Engineering department at the University of California, Los Angeles, where he conducts research and teaching on RF CMOS design, high speed integrated circuit design, data converter, and mixed-signal circuit designs. He is the Director of the UCLA High Speed Electronics Laboratory.

Before joining UCLA in 1997, he was the Assistant Director and Department Manager of the High Speed Electronics Laboratory at the Rockwell International Science Center (now Teledyne Technologies) from 1983 to 1997 in Thousand Oaks, California. In this tenure, he successfully developed and transferred AlGaAs/GaAs Heterojunction Bipolar Transistor (HBT) and BiFET (Planar HBT/MESFET) integrated circuits technologies from the research laboratory to the production line. The HBT and BiFET productions have grown into multibillion-dollar businesses worldwide. He was the inventor of the multi-band, re-configurable RF-Interconnects based on FDMA and CDMA multiple access algorithms for intra- and inter-ULSI communications.

Chang was elected to the National Academy of Engineering in 2008, for the development and commercialization of GaAs HBT power amplifiers and integrated circuits. He received the IEEE David Sarnoff Award in 2006 and became a Fellow of IEEE in 1996. He also received Pan Wen-Yuan Foundation Award in 2008, Rockwell's Leonardo da Vinci Award (Engineer of the Year) in 1992, National Chiao Tung University’s Distinguished Alumnus Award in 1997, and the National Tsing Hua University Distinguished Alumnus Award in 2002.

In November 2014, Dr. Chang was elected as the 11th president of National Chiao Tung University in Hsinchu, Taiwan. In 2017, he was awarded the IET JJ Thomson Medal ( IET Achievement Medals ) in London.

Awards and honors
IET JJ Thomson Medal (2017)
Distinguished Alumnus Award, National Taiwan University, Taipei, Taiwan (2013)
Academician, Academia Sinica, Taipei, Taiwan (2012)
Best Paper Award, IEEE Journal of Solid-State Circuits (2012)
Distinguished Technical Paper Award, IEEE International Solid-State Circuit Conference (2012)
Jack Kilby Best Student Paper Award, IEEE International Solid-State Circuit Conference (2012)
Best Paper Award, IEEE Radio Frequency Integrated Circuit Conference (RFIC) (2009)
Member of National Academy of Engineering (2008)
 "For the development and commercialization of GaAs power amplifiers and integrated circuits."
Pan Wen Yuan Foundation Award (2008)
Best Paper Award, IEEE High Performance Computer Architecture (HPCA) Symposium (2008)
IEEE David Sarnoff Award (2006)
 "For development of HBT power amplifiers leading to their commercialization in wireless communications."
Distinguished Alumnus Award from the National Tsing-Hua University (2002)
Distinguished Alumnus Award from the National Chiao-Tung University (1997)
IEEE Fellow (1996)
Leonardo da Vinci Award (Rockwell International Engineer of the Year) (1993)

Fellowships and Academy Membership

Academician, Academia Sinica, Taipei, Taiwan (2012)
Member of National Academy of Engineering (2008)
IEEE Fellow (1996)

Books

References

External links
 UCLA High Speed Electronics Laboratory home
 UCLA Electrical Engineering Department homepage

Living people
American electrical engineers
American people of Taiwanese descent
UCLA Henry Samueli School of Engineering and Applied Science faculty
National Tsing Hua University alumni
Electrical engineering academics
1951 births
Members of the United States National Academy of Engineering